Jun Kwang-ryul is a South Korean actor. He is best known for his roles in the television series Hur Jun, Jumong and King of Baking, Kim Takgu.

Filmography

Television series

Jinxed at First (2022)
Kingmaker: The Change of Destiny (2020)
Witch at Court (2017)
The Flower in Prison (2016)
The Royal Gambler (2016)
Remember (2015–2016)
Hello Monster (2015)
The Man in the Mask (2015)
Passionate Love (2013)
Goddess of Fire ( 2013)
Missing You (2012–2013)
Lights and Shadows (2011–2012)
Warrior Baek Dong-soo (2011)
Sign (2011)
Road of Hope (2010)
King of Baking, Kim Takgu (2010)
Swallow the Sun (2009)
The King and I (2007–2008)
Jumong (2006–2007)
Recipe of Love (2005)
Love and Sympathy (2005)
The Age of Heroes 2004–2005)
Jang Hee-bin (2002–2003)
Hur Jun (1999–2000)
Roses and Bean Sprouts (1999)
Trap of Youth (1999)
I Only Know Love (1998)
Advocate (1998)
Light in the Field (1997)
Model (1997)
Meeting (1996)
Their Embrace (1996)
Mimang (1996–1997)
Angel Beneath the Mask (1995)
The Lonely Man (1994)
Shoal (1994)
General Hospital (1994–1996)
Ambition (1994)
너의 뺨에 입맞추리 (1994)
Hot River (1993)
Stormy Season (1993)
Winter Bird (1992)
Burn Like a Candle (1991)
너두 늙어봐라 (1991)
Lost Island (1990)
Mt. Jiri (1989)

Film
Snatch Up (2018)
2424 (2002)
Kiss Me Much (2001)
I Wish I Had a Wife (2001)

Television shows 
 Healing Mountain Lodge 2 (2021) - Host
 Santa Expedition (2022) - Narrator

Awards
2013 SBS Drama Awards: Top Excellence Award, Actor (Passionate Love)
2012 MBC Drama Awards: Golden Acting Award, Actor (Lights and Shadows, Missing You)
2011 SBS Drama Awards: Excellence Award, Actor in a Special Planning Drama (Sign, Warrior Baek Dong-soo)
2010 KBS Entertainment Awards: Achievement Award (Road of Hope)
2010 44th Taxpayer's Day: Model Taxpayer Citation
2007 SBS Drama Awards: Top Excellence Award, Actor; Top 10 Stars (The King and I)
2006 MBC Drama Awards: Top Excellence Award, Actor (Jumong)
2000 MBC Drama Awards: Grand Prize ("Daesang") (Hur Jun)
2000 36th Baeksang Arts Awards: Most Popular Actor (TV) (Hur Jun)

References

External links
 
 
 

20th-century South Korean male actors
21st-century South Korean male actors
South Korean male television actors
South Korean male film actors
Living people
Year of birth missing (living people)